The Splendor Hotel Taichung, or Grand Formosa Taichung is a skyscraper hotel completed in 1998 in West District, Taichung, Taiwan.

The Hotel
The exterior of the hotel is designed by Taiwanese architect Chu-Yuan Lee. The five-star hotel has a total of 222 rooms including premium suites, three themed restaurants, a café, a cigar bar. It also offers a multistoried large banquet hall as well as an outdoor temperature-controlled sky pool with a view overlooking the city of Taichung. The hotel features a Made in Taiwan Shop for tourists to buy souvenirs and presents.

Restaurants and  Bars 
 Brasserie''': Buffet located on the 12th floor offering signature dishes.
 Splendor Garden Restaurant: Chinese restaurant located on the 15th floor featuring traditional authentic Chinese cuisine and Dim Sum.
 Laura's Steak House: Restaurant also on the 12th floor offering steaks with a view of Taichung's skyline.
 Splendor Teppanyaki: Restaurant offering Japanese-style teppanyaki.
 Lobby Lounge: Lounge offering a variety of light meals and beverages.

See also
 Le Meridien Taichung
 National Hotel (Taiwan)
 Millennium Vee Hotel Taichung

References

External links
The Splendor Hotel Taichung Official Website 
 The Splendor Hotel Taichung - Tourism Bureau of the Ministry of Transport of the Republic of China 

1998 establishments in Taiwan
Buildings and structures in Taichung
Skyscraper hotels in Taichung
Hotel buildings completed in 1998